Fraser Thorneycroft-Smith (born 8 February 1971), known professionally as Fraser T. Smith, is an English record producer, songwriter and musician. Some of the singles he collaborated on include Adele's "Set Fire to the Rain", James Morrison's "Broken Strings", Tinchy Stryder's "Number 1" and Taio Cruz's "Break Your Heart". In 2016, Smith teamed up with Stormzy to produce his debut album Gang Signs & Prayer, which won Best Album at the 2018 Brit Awards. Earlier that year he produced seven tracks on Kano's Made in the Manor album and co-produced the debut EP from South London rapper Dave. Smith has also worked with Sam Smith.

Smith released his debut album, 12 Questions, on 30 October 2020. The record is based on a series of 12 questions all born of Smith’s own anxieties about the world, discussing issues such as faith, freedom, race, gender, wealth, equality and ecology. Smith collaborated with Dave, Kano, Ghetts, Bastille, Idris Elba and Stormzy.

On 18 March 2021, Smith was presented with a RSL (Rockschool Ltd) Fellowship. In August 2021, Dave and Smith were nominated for the Ivor Novello Awards 2021 in the Best Contemporary Song category for "Children of the Internet". Dave and Smith subsequently won. This was their third Ivor Novello win in four years. The song is performed by Future Utopia. This was producer Smith’s new project and features Dave and Es Devlin.

Career
Smith started his career playing guitar in pubs and clubs both as a solo musician and in bands. In 1992, Smith met Rick Wakeman with whom he toured and recorded. Smith then went on to work with Tony Hadley and Adam Wakeman. In the mid-1990s, they formed Jeronimo Road, a progressive rock band. Smith then became involved in playing guitar in studio sessions, performing on over 200 records, including Rui da Silva's number one "Touch Me" and Tim Deluxe's "It Just Won’t Do".

In 1999, Smith was introduced to the then-unknown Craig David and spent five years working as his guitarist performing on television and radio, as well as at concerts including the John Lennon Tribute Concert at Radio City Hall in New York, the Tsunami Relief Cardiff at the Millennium Stadium in Cardiff, and Live 8, London. They remixed songs together under the pseudonym of Treats and have written the songs "World Filled With Love", "6 of 1 Thing", and "Hot Stuff".

In 2011, Smith won a Grammy Award for his work with Adele.

In 2012, Smith was nominated for an Ivor Novello Award for his writing on "Broken Strings". In 2015, Smith was nominated for Album of the Year in the 57th Grammy Awards for his contribution to Sam Smith's album In the Lonely Hour.

Between 2013 and 2016, Smith worked with longtime collaborator Kano on his album Made in the Manor, which was subsequently shortlisted for the 2016 Mercury Prize and nominated for Album of the Year at the 2017 Brit Awards. It went on to win Best Album at the MOBO Awards.

Smith also collaborated with Mexican duo Jesse & Joy on their album Un Besito Más, which was released in December 2015. At the 17th Annual Latin Grammy Awards, the album received the nomination for Album of the Year and won for Best Contemporary Pop Vocal Album.

In 2016, Smith was approached by grime and hip hop artist Stormzy. They spent ten months writing and producing his debut album, Gang Signs & Prayer, released independently through #Merky Records on 24 February 2017. The album was supported by the lead single "Big for Your Boots".

During the COVID-19 pandemic, Smith produced the Live Lounge Allstars' charity version of the Foo Fighters' "Times Like These", featuring twenty-four musicians recorded from their homes.

In 2018, Smith and the rapper Dave won an Ivor Novello Award for the track "Question Time". In 2020, they won an Ivor Novello Award for the track "Black".

Discography

Studio album

Selected song writing and production credits

Awards and nominations

References

External links

1971 births
Living people
English songwriters
English male guitarists
English record producers
English multi-instrumentalists
People from Taplow
People educated at Reading Blue Coat School
People educated at Sir William Borlase's Grammar School
Grammy Award winners
21st-century British guitarists
21st-century British male musicians
British male songwriters